Soe Myint (born 22 September 1958) is a Burmese sports shooter. He competed in the men's 10 metre air pistol event at the 1996 Summer Olympics.

References

External links
 

1958 births
Living people
Burmese male sport shooters
Olympic shooters of Myanmar
Shooters at the 1996 Summer Olympics
Place of birth missing (living people)